The 1984 Soviet First League was the fourteenth season of the Soviet First League and the 44th season of the Soviet second tier league competition.

Final standings

Top scorers

Number of teams by union republic

External links
 1984 season. RSSSF

1984
2
Soviet
Soviet